Petra Kvitová was the defending champion, but lost in the first round to Peng Shuai.

Caroline Garcia won the title, defeating Ashleigh Barty in the final, 6–7(3–7), 7–6(7–4), 6–2.

Garbiñe Muguruza retained the WTA no. 1 singles ranking after Simona Halep and Karolína Plíšková lost in the second round and quarterfinals, respectively.

Seeds
The top eight seeds received a bye into the second round.

Draw

Finals

Top half

Section 1

Section 2

Bottom half

Section 3

Section 4

Qualifying

Seeds

Qualifiers

Draw

First qualifier

Second qualifier

Third qualifier

Fourth qualifier

Fifth qualifier

Sixth qualifier

Seventh qualifier

Eighth qualifier

References 

 Main draw
 Qualifying draw

Singles